Michael Zerafa (born 25 March 1992) is an Australian professional boxer who held the Commonwealth super-welterweight title in 2018.

Boxing career
Early in his career, he was the Victorian super-welterweight champion.

Zerafa vs. Magomedov 
On 24 October 2014, he lost to Arif Magomedov in his first fight outside Australia when challenging for the WBO Youth and Asia Pacific middleweight titles.

Zerafa vs. Quillin 
On 12 September 2015, he lost via knockout to Peter Quillin in his second fight outside Australia. The impact of the knockout caused him to leave the arena on a stretcher.

Zerafa vs. Kirima 
On 22 April 2016, Zerafa defeated Yosuke Kirima for the IBF Pan Pacific middleweight title.

Zerafa vs. Brook 
On 5 November 2018, it was announced Zerafa would face Kell Brook at the Sheffield Arena on 8 December 2018, in a WBA super-welterweight title eliminator. He lost the fight via unanimous decision.

Zerafa vs. Sherrington 
On 12 April 2019, Zerafa returned home to Australia and defeated Les Sherrington via knockout.

Zerafa vs. Horn 
He then defeated Jeff Horn for the WBA Oceania middleweight title in Bendigo on 31 August 2019, this time winning via technical knockout. Horn was ranked #3 by the WBA, #5 by the WBO and #14 by the IBF at middleweight at the time.

Zerafa vs. Ritchie 
On 9 November 2019, Zerafa was sparring with Dwight Ritchie when Ritchie collapsed in between rounds after a hit to the chest. Ritchie could not be revived and later died.

Zerafa vs. Hardman 
On 20 April 2022, Zerafa faced Isaac Hardman in an IBF title eliminator at Melbourne Convention and Exhibition Centre where Zerafa would knockout Hardman in the second round.

World title opportunity 
Zerafa was originally slated to fight Esquiva Falcão for the vacant IBF middleweight world title.  However, Zerafa opted to pursue a World Boxing Association title fight against Erislandy Lara, so Falcão is now slated to fight Vincenzo Gualtieri for the IBF title.

Professional boxing record

Personal life
His mother is from Australia and his father is from Malta.

References

External links

Michael Zerafa - Profile, News Archive & Current Rankings at Box.Live

1992 births
Living people
Australian male boxers
Middleweight boxers
Australian people of Maltese descent
Boxers from Melbourne